The 1936 La Flèche Wallonne was the inaugural edition of La Flèche Wallonne cycle race and was held on 13 April 1936. The race started in Tournai and finished in Liège. The race was won by Philémon De Meersman.

General classification

References

1936 in road cycling
1936
1936 in Belgian sport